Miss Ecuador 2017, the 67th Miss Ecuador pageant, was held on April 22, 2017 in Babahoyo, Los Ríos. Connie Jiménez, Miss Ecuador 2016 from Los Ríos crowned her successor Daniela Cepeda from Guayas at the end of the event. The winner represented Ecuador at Miss Universe 2017.

Results

Placements

Special Awards

Best National Costume

Contestants

Notes

Returns

Last compete in:

2015
 Cotopaxi
 Imbabura
 Santo Domingo

Withdraws

 El Oro
 Santa Elena

Crossovers
Daniela Cepeda was Miss Teen Ecuador 2015, and she won the title of Miss Teen Earth 2015 at Panama.
Bianca Benavides competed at Reina de Guayaquil 2016 where she was 3rd Runner-up.
Mónica González competed at Reina de Guayaquil 2013 where she was 2nd Runner-up (Estrella de Octubre). She competed at Reina del Guayas 2014 where she won the crown. Furthermore, she won the title of  Reina Mundial del Banano Ecuador 2015, and competed at  Reina Mundial del Banano 2015 where she was unplaced.
Dayanara Peralta was the 1st Runner-up (Virreina) at Miss Teen Americas 2014, and she was the winner of Miss Teen Universe 2015 contest.
Belén Ruiz was selected as Miss Atlántico Ecuador 2014, and competed at Miss Atlántico Internacional 2014 where she was unplaced.
Génesis Parra was the 1st Runner-up (Virreina) at Reina de Naranjal 2016.
María José Villacís was 2nd Runner-up (Señorita Rurismo) at Reina de Ibarra 2015. She was elected Miss World Imbabura 2016, but she withdrew the national competition.
Fernanda Muñoz was Reina de Vinces 2013.
Zully Granda was Reina de Puyango 2011.
Katheryne López was elected Miss Manabí 2015.
Corina Zambrano was Reina de Tosagua 2013.

References

External links
Official Miss Ecuador website

2017 beauty pageants
Beauty pageants in Ecuador
Miss Ecuador